Puente 13 (P13) is a street gang in La Puente, California. They are Sureños. They are described as Mafia related or Mexican mafia related. They were formed c. 1953 as the Bridgetown Gentlemen (puente is Spanish "bridge"), or "Old Town Puente". Then they dropped the "Old Town", later adding the "-13" that signifies allegiance to the Mexican Mafia. In 2010 the gang had 3,000 documented members. The gang is known for its violent criminal activities, drug smuggling and illicit contributions to the Mexican Mafia.

Territory
Puente 13 claims the entire city and is one of the largest gangs in the San Gabriel Valley. With several hundred documented members in 2004, they were the most active in the SGV.

Notable events
2013: Two carnals (leaders) of the gang taken down.

2018: 17 people were indicted on identity theft charges and charges relating to supplying methamphetamine, including to the Pitchess Detention Center in Castaic, after an investigation into the gang led by the DEA and the USSS.

References

Organizations established in 1953
1953 establishments in California
Sureños
Latino street gangs
Gangs in Los Angeles
Mexican-American culture in Los Angeles
La Puente, California